Rossif Sutherland (born September 25, 1978) is a Canadian actor. He, along with his brothers Angus and Roeg and half-brother Kiefer, are the sons of Donald Sutherland.

Early life and education 
Sutherland was born in Vancouver, but lived in Paris, France, from age seven. He is the second son of Canadian actors Donald Sutherland and Francine Racette, brother of actor Angus Sutherland and Roeg Sutherland, and paternal half-brother of actor Kiefer Sutherland and his twin sister Rachel Sutherland. He was named after director Frédéric Rossif.

He studied philosophy at Princeton University.

Career 
He has appeared in films such as Timeline (as François Dontelle), and Red Doors (as Alex). He had a recurring role on the television show ER during its tenth season. Sutherland had a small role in the TV series Monk in the episode "Mr. Monk and the Other Detective," as well as a guest appearance in several episodes of Season 5 of the TV series Covert Affairs.

Sutherland has since appeared in the movie Poor Boy's Game with Danny Glover and Flex Alexander and also in the 2009 comedy/drama, High Life, with Timothy Olyphant, Russell Peters, Greg Germann. He appeared with his father Donald in the 2010 Comedy The Con Artist directed by Risa Bramon Garcia.

In 2012 he joined the cast of the television show King. Starting the following year, he appeared as Nostradamus on American historical fantasy television series Reign. In 2015, he starred in the indie films River and Hyena Road. For his role in River, he received a Canadian Screen Award nomination in 2016.

Personal life 
Sutherland married British actress and Reign co-star Celina Sinden in February 2016; they have one son. He speaks fluent French.

Filmography

Film

Television

Awards and nominations

References

External links 

1978 births
21st-century Canadian male actors
Canadian male film actors
Canadian male television actors
Canadian male voice actors
Canadian people of Scottish descent
French Quebecers
Living people
Male actors from Vancouver
Princeton University alumni
Rossif